All Delighted People is an EP by Sufjan Stevens, released online by Asthmatic Kitty Records on August 20, 2010. It is centered around two versions of Stevens' ballad "All Delighted People". According to the official release webpage it is an "homage to the Apocalypse, existential ennui, and Paul Simon's 'Sound of Silence'". It debuted at #48 on the Billboard 200 and jumped to number #27 the week after.

Critical reception

All Delighted People received mostly positive reviews from contemporary music critics. At Metacritic, which assigns a normalized rating out of 100 to reviews from mainstream critics, the album received an average score of 63, based on 12 reviews, which indicates "generally favorable reviews".

Ian Cohen of Pitchfork Media gave the EP a positive review stating, "It isn't the mere existence of Age of Adz that puts this EP in perspective, though-- the electronic sonics of first taste "I Walked" are a blatant sign that we may ultimately have to retire the idea of Sufjan Stevens as a banjo-toting cartographer of the heart and the continental United States going forward. The scrapbook-like cover of All Delighted People makes sense then, as its contents serve as a humble and friendly keepsake, songs that deserve to be heard, but belonging to a chapter in Stevens' artistic livelihood that he needed to close to maintain his vitality."

Track listing

Vinyl edition

Notes:
Side D contains piano solos originally recorded as a soundtrack to the 2008 short film Eve, directed by Natalie Portman. No information is contained about these in the vinyl release.

Charts

References

External links
Sufjan Stevens release page for All Delighted People EP

2010 EPs
Albums produced by Sufjan Stevens
Asthmatic Kitty EPs
Sufjan Stevens EPs